Abner Mares vs. Joseph Agbeko was a championship fight for the WBC Silver & IBF bantamweight championships. The bout was held on August 13, 2011, at Hard Rock Hotel and Casino, Las Vegas, Nevada, United States, and was televised on Showtime. The bout was marred in controversy due to the prevalence of low blows by Mares that went unpenalized by referee Russell Mora.

Main card
Bantamweight Championship  Abner Mares vs.  Joseph Agbeko
Mares defeats Agbeko via majority decision. (115-111, 113-113, 115-111)

Preliminary card
Bantamweight bout  Eric Morel vs.  Daniel Quevedo
Morel defeats Quevedo via technical knockout (retirement) at 3:00 of fourth round
Light Welterweight bout  Carlos Molina vs.  Juan Montiel
Bout was ruled a split decision draw. (78-74, 76-76, 74-77)
Heavyweight bout  Éric Molina vs.  Warren Browning
Molina defeats Browining via technical knockout at 0:24 of third round
Light Welterweight bout  Angelo Santana vs.  Ramzan Adaev
Santana defeats Adaev via technical knockout at 2:02 of second round.

References

External links

Mares vs. Agbeko Official Fight Card from BoxRec

Boxing matches
2011 in boxing
Boxing in Las Vegas
2011 in sports in Nevada
August 2011 sports events in the United States
Hard Rock Hotel and Casino (Las Vegas)